Luka Janežič (born 14 November 1995) is a Slovenian sprinter. He competed in the 400 metres event at the 2015 World Championships in Beijing without advancing from the first round. In the 2016 Olympic Games, Janežič advanced to the 400 m semifinals and exceeded his own national record in the event.

Competition record

1Did not start in the semifinals

2Disqualified in the semifinals

Personal bests
Outdoor
200 metres – 20.89 (−1.1 m/s, Kranj 2015)
400 metres – 44.84 (Monaco 2017) NR
Indoor
400 metres – 46.02 (Vienna 2017) NR

References

External links
 

1995 births
Living people
Slovenian male sprinters
World Athletics Championships athletes for Slovenia
People from the Municipality of Vodice
Athletes (track and field) at the 2016 Summer Olympics
Olympic athletes of Slovenia
Athletes (track and field) at the 2020 Summer Olympics
European Games competitors for Slovenia
Athletes (track and field) at the 2019 European Games